Class M11 is a mainline diesel-electric locomotive built by Banaras Locomotive Works, India, for use on Sri Lanka Railways and first delivered in 2018. This locomotive, clearly with its look, was developed from the WDG-4D locomotive of the Indian Railways, which is originally of 4,500 HP (3.4 MW), as it uses a 16-cylinder variant of the EMD 710 prime mover. The HP was Down-tweaked to 3,000 (2.25 MW) using a 12-cylinder variant of the same engine, making it look and sound similar to British/European Railways' popular Class 66 EMD locomotive, but with AC-AC traction.

The completed units are delivered by road trailer from Varanasi to the port of Chennai, before shipment to Sri Lanka. The units feature a microprocessor control system, TFT monitors as display units and roof-mounted Dynamic Brake Resistors. The locomotives were built under the auspices of the Make in India program. 

As of January 2020, ten M 11 locomotives have been purchased under an Indian loan, with 8 being brought into the country. A total of 10 locomotives and 6 power sets were purchased for Rs 1000 million. 

Local railway trade unions have expressed concern that the locomotives are not suitable for the rail lines in Sri Lanka. Union officials say the locomotives are too long to safely operate on local rail lines, being longer than any locomotive in service in Sri Lanka. They also note that the locomotives are equipped with an air compressor brake system, while most carriages in use in Sri Lanka have vacuum brakes, noting that the new M11s can’t be used with most carriages in the country other than recently imported Chinese coaches. 

The union officials also explain that railway lines in Sri Lanka are not maintained to such a high standard as they are in India and that using a high horsepower locomotive to pull only a few carriages seemed wasteful. Major rail lines would need to be rebuilt in order to use the M11 locomotives to their full potential. The locomotives are deemed unsuitable by their operators for their tasks they are assigned, putting public safety at risk. Union officials have expressed concern that government officials received large commissions when the locomotives were delivered. Railway officials have said all allegations are baseless.  

A significant accident occurred when M11 number 953 derailed on 19 December 2019 on the line between Maradana and Dermatagoda stations, causing the line to be shut down for two days. The Puttalam and Kelani Valley lines were also affected by the accident.

See also

Diesel locomotives of Sri Lanka

References

M11
5 ft 6 in gauge locomotives